Eldersburg is an unincorporated community and census-designated place (CDP) in Carroll County, Maryland, United States. The population was 30,531 at the 2010 census.

History
Eldersburg is named after John Elder, who was given a land grant from the King of England. The community was served by a post office in April 1850 in the Howard district of Anne Arundel County with the name "Eldersburgh." In 1851, Howard County was formed, and on October 28, 1871, the post office moved to Carroll County, retaining the "Eldersburgh" spelling. In December 1894, "Eldersburgh" was shortened to "Eldersburg". The Moses Brown House was listed on the National Register of Historic Places in 1980. Wesley Chapel Methodist Episcopal Church was listed in 1984.

Geography
Eldersburg is located in the southeastern portion of Carroll County at  (39.400802, −76.951475). It is bordered to the east by Baltimore County and to the south by Howard County, except where it is bordered by the town of Sykesville.

The center of Eldersburg is at the intersection of Maryland Route 26 (Liberty Road) and Maryland Route 32 (Sykesville Road). MD 26 leads east  to downtown Baltimore and west  to Frederick, while MD 32 leads north  to Westminster, the Carroll County seat, and south  to Columbia.

Demographics

As of the census of 2010, there were 30,531 people and 10,844 households within the CDP. The racial makeup of the CDP was 92.44% White, 3.42% African American, 0.22% Native American, 1.98% Asian, 0.44% from other races, 0.76% from two or more races, and 1.47% of the population were Hispanic or Latino of any race. The majority of Hispanics and Latinos in Eldersburg identified as White; 75% of Latinos in Eldersburg were White and White Latinos comprised 1.7 of Eldersburg's total population. Non-Hispanics in Eldersburg were predominantly White; 90.8% of Eldersburg's residents were non-Hispanic whites, 3.4% were non-Hispanic blacks, and 2% were non-Hispanic Asians. By national origin, 27% of Eldersburg's Latinos were of Mexican descent, 18% were of Puerto Rican descent, and 9% were of Cuban descent.

According to the 2000 Census, there were 9,138 households, of which 44.1% included children under the age of 18, 72.2% were married couples, 7.1% were single females, and 17.9% were non-families. 14.8% of all households were individuals, and 7.2% of households consisted of someone 65 years of age or older living alone. The average household size was 2.92, and the average family size was 3.25. As of 2000, the ancestry of Eldersburg's residents was 24% German, 18% Irish, 13% English, 8% Italian, 5% Polish, 3% Black or African-American, 2% French, 2% Scottish and 2% Dutch. People of Scotch-Irish, Swedish, Greek, Welsh, Russian, Hungarian, Slovak and Lithuanian descent each comprised 1% of the population.

Census data found that 29.1% of the population were under the age of 18, 5.9% were 18 to 24, 31.9% were 25 to 44, 23.7% were 45 to 64, and 9.4% were 65 or older. The median age was 36. For every 100 females, there were 101.3 males. For every 100 females age 18 and over, there were 98.4 males.

The median income for a household was $70,851, and the median income for a family was $75,848. Males had a median income of $51,473; females had a median income of $34,728. The per capita income was $25,639. About 1.6% of families and 2.4% of the population were below the poverty line, including 1.9% of those under age 18 and 4.6% of those age 65 or over.

In 2007, Money.com ranked Eldersburg 56th in its "Top 100 Places to Live." In 2009, Eldersburg ranked 47th on the same list.

Religion

Christianity
Christianity is the dominant religion in Eldersburg. Eldersburg is home to Wesley Chapel Methodist Episcopal Church, one of the earliest Methodist congregations in the United States. Carroll County was a birthplace of Methodism in the United States.

Judaism
The Chabad Jewish Center of Carroll County, an Orthodox synagogue, was founded in Eldersburg in 2013. Prior to Chabad, Carroll County had no synagogue for years. A decade before, the only synagogue in Carroll County was Beth Shalom, a Conservative synagogue that no longer exists. Beginning in 1996, Beth Shalom was operating the only Jewish school in Carroll County. Eldersburg is also home to the Eldersburg Jewish Congregation, a Conservative synagogue that operated the Eldersburg Hebrew Learning Center. In 2013, the Hebrew Learning Center was merged into A Hebrew School in Your Neighborhood, a program run by Beth El of Pikesville.

Education
Eldersburg is served by the Carroll County public school system. The elementary schools include Eldersburg Elementary, Carrolltowne Elementary, Piney Ridge Elementary, Freedom Elementary School, and Linton Springs Elementary. The middle schools include Oklahoma Road Middle School and Sykesville Middle School (located in Sykesville). The high schools include Liberty High School, South Carroll High School, and Century High School.

Transportation
The Carroll Transit System runs the  South Carroll TrailBlazer (Red Route), which links Eldersburg to Sykesville, as well as the Eldersburg-Westminster TrailBlazer (Blue Route) which links Eldersburg to Westminster. The Owings Mills station of the Baltimore Metro SubwayLink in nearby Owings Mills in Baltimore County, is a 20-minute drive by car from Eldersburg and provides subway access to downtown Baltimore.

There is no bus link between Eldersburg and nearby Randallstown in Baltimore County, in part due to longstanding opposition to inter-county public transit from Carroll County officials and residents.

References

External links

 Eldersburg Official
 Eldersburg Today
 Eldersburg Weather
 Eldersburg Rogue Runners
 Eldersburg Facebook Group

 
Unincorporated communities in Carroll County, Maryland
Census-designated places in Carroll County, Maryland
Census-designated places in Maryland
Unincorporated communities in Maryland